The Hanafi school (Arabic: حنفي Ḥanafī) is one of the four schools of Sunni Islamic jurisprudence (Fiqh).

Hanafi, al-Hanafi, or Hanafy may also refer to:
 Hanafi Movement, 1958–1977 African American Muslim movement founded by Hamaas Abdul Khaalis 
 Hanafi Madh-Hab Center, at 7700 16th Street NW, Washington DC; headquarters of the Hanafi Movement
 1973 Hanafi Muslim massacre, at the center
 1977 Hanafi Siege, by the Hanafi Movement
 Hanafi Mosque of Bourguiba, Tunisia
 Surname:
 Alam al-Din al-Hanafi (1178–1251), Egyptian mathematician
 Amal Mahmoud Hanafy (born 1978), Egyptian powerlifter
 Amer El-Hanafi (born 1934), Egyptian weightlifter
 Amira Hanafi (born 1979), American/Egyptian poet and artist active in electronic literature
 Hassan Hanafi (1935–2021), Egyptian philosophy professor
 Hesham Hanafy (born 1973), Egyptian footballer. 
 Mohamed El-Gohary Hanafy (born 1955), Egyptian basketball player
 Najda ibn Amir al-Hanafi (c.655–691/92), Arabian Kharijite rebel leader
 Sari Hanafi, Syrian-Palestinian sociology professor
 Given name:
 Hanafi Akbar (born 1995), Singaporean footballer
 Hanafy Bastan (1922–1995), Egyptian footballer
 Hanafi Moustafa (fl. 1948), Egyptian weightlifter

See also
 Miss Hanafi, 1954 Egyptian comedy film
 Hanifa (disambiguation)